Padma Meghna Jamuna is a Bangladeshi National award-winning film directed by Chashi Nazrul Islam ( Bengali: চাষী নজরুল ইসলাম). The film was released 1991. The film produced by Mohammad Iqbal Hossain and story written by Mohammed Mohiuddin and also screenplay and dialogue by Jalaluddin Rumi. The film stars Bobita, Farooque, Champa, Bulbul Ahmed, ATM Shamsuzzaman and more. In 1991, this film received the National Film Award for the best film award including other six categories.

Cast 
 Farooque – Hashu 
 Bobita – Saju 
 Champa – Maju 
 Bulbul Ahmed – Ratan 
 Aliraj – Ikram
 Shawkat Akbar – Bashar Ahmed
 ATM Shamsuzzaman – Boro Miyan
 Khaleda Aktar Kolpona – Kismat Banu
 Ahmed Sharif – Khayer Khan
 Rasheda- Nasiman
 Minu Rahman – Ekram's Mother
 Sushma- Ratan's mother

Music
The film's music is directed by Nurul Alam Khandaker. Song written by Nazrul Islam Babu and Mohammad Rafikuzzam. Sung by Sabina Yasmin, Andrew Kishore, Runa Laila, Kiran Chandra Roy, Shammi Akhtar, Subir Nandi and Abida Sultana.

Soundtrack

Awards

See also 
Bhalobaslei Ghor Bandha Jay Na

References

External links
 

1991 films
Bengali-language Bangladeshi films
Films scored by Khandaker Nurul Alam
1990s Bengali-language films
Best Film National Film Award (Bangladesh) winners